Huddy is an unincorporated community in Pike County, Kentucky. Huddy had a post office, which closed on January 22, 2011.

References

Unincorporated communities in Pike County, Kentucky
Unincorporated communities in Kentucky